The Theatre of Living Arts (known commonly as the TLA) is a concert venue located on South Street in Philadelphia, Pennsylvania. The venue, which opened in 1988, dates back to the early 1900s as a nickelodeon. Over the years, the venue has seen many incarnations ranging from concert hall to movie theatre to theatre. Known for its acoustics, it was voted as one of the best concert venues in America by Complex.

History
The theatre opened in 1908 as the "Crystal Palace", seating nearly 700. In 1927, the venue became a concert hall. In 1941, Warner Bros. Circuit Management Corporation took over management of the venue converting it into a movie theatre. Along with the changes came a new name, the "New Palace Theatre". The theatre’s popularity declined in the 50s. By 1959, the theatre saw another reincarnation, this time as a repertory theatre. The theatre operated under the direction of stage veteran Anne Ramsey and her husband Logan Ramsey. This is also when the name, "Theatre of the Living Arts" came into being.

In 1964, Andre Gregory took over from the Ramseys as artistic director. The theatre proved to be a critical success, presenting 10 productions per season, all to high praise. Some troupe members included: Danny DeVito, Judd Hirsch, Sally Kirkland, Ron Leibman and Morgan Freeman. In 1967, a dispute with the board of directors resulted in Gregory leaving the theatre on February 17, 1967. At this time, the theatre was taken over by a new firm and christened as the "Bandbox Living Arts", a beatnik house. The theatre saw a decline in popularity and closed in 1969 due to financial issues.

In 1970, business entrepreneur Al Malmfelt purchased the theatre. It reopened a year later as a single screen cinema; specializing in hard to see films. Nearly 20 films were shown per week. The movie house showed classic films, alongside art films, foreigns, serials and controversial films. There was also a monsters at midnight film series, with the venue showing horror films. In 1976, it premiered The Rocky Horror Picture Show. The TLA was the first theatre in Philadelphia to show this "midnight movie" which became an instant success with fans and led to weekly showings, encouraging the audience to dress as their favorite characters and return week after week.

In 1978, the American Theater Arts for Youth used the venue for several productions including: Babes in Toyland, The Adventures of Tom Sawyer and The Wizard of Oz. It left the venue in 1982 to seek a bigger audience. By November 1980, the theatre was once again in financial trouble. The theatre folded once again in 1981.

Stephen Starr purchased the building for $600,000 in March 1981. He hoped to bring his Starr nightclub to a bigger facility, however, this was prevented by the Pennsylvania Liquor Control Board and local residents of the neighborhood. Instead, Starr reopened the cinema under the name The Palace, however it closed again September 1981. In 1981, former employees Claire Brown Kohler, Eric Moore and Ray Murray began working on how to reopen the theatre. Together, they formed the Repertory Cinema, Inc. (later becoming the TLA Entertainment Group). When the theatre reopened, to save costs, the new team would travel round trip to New York City to exchange reels.

Due to the success of VHS and cable television, the cinema saw a decline in attendance. In 1985, the team then opened TLA Video to cater to that audience. The initial store opened next to the theatre, however, four additional locations were added throughout the Philadelphia metro area. All stores closed in 2011.

In 1986 the TLA premiered Jean-Luc Godard's Hail Mary which sparked outrage among Catholics. Many protesters picketed outside the TLA for a week while they showed the film.

In 1987, the cinema folded again. Allan Spivak purchased the theatre in September 1987 and renovations took place to convert the venue from a cinema into an off-Broadway type of venue. Its first show was a production of the 1986 Outer Critics Circle Awards winning (and 2014 Tony Award winning) musical Lady Day which opened October 21, 1987.

A year later, the theatre was converted into a concert venue. In 2006, Live Nation purchased it, and it was briefly known as "The Fillmore at TLA" (commonly The Fillmore Philadelphia) until June 2008.

Facility 
In addition to its various incarnations through the twentieth century, the building housing the TLA has also undergone transformations. After the New Palace Theatre became The Theatre of the Living Arts in 1959, in 1965 it underwent renovations designed by one of its founders, Philadelphia modernist architect Frank Weise. At that time the theatre expanded to the next door property, expanding the venue.

The venue was later renovated in 2006 when Live Nation purchased it, and it became The Fillmore. The company updated the theatre with hardwood floors and three large chandeliers. The venue is known for its memorabilia hanging on the dark red walls inside it.

Culture 
South Street's reputation for entertainment extends to the turn of the twentieth century. However, in 1950 there was a major decline in real-estate value due to the proposal of a crosstown expressway that would have wiped out South Street. The Theatre of the Living Arts founding helped re-establish the street's entertainment culture and ushered in a revival of the street. It was a success during this time period selling over 250,000 tickets between 1964 and 1969. The TLA set the stage for the bohemian counterculture that flocked to this street along with other consumer and artistic venues. The street had a major rise in galleries and cafes that surrounded the TLA.

South Street has become a center for alternative countercultures. In its current iteration as a concert venue, the theatre welcomes unknown and up-and-coming bands  as well as bigger bands such as Red Hot Chili Peppers.

TLA Entertainment Group 

The TLA entertainment group branched off of the TLA movie theatre and was originally the group that ran the theatre. The group was founded in 1981 by Ray Murray, Claire Brown Kohler, and Eric Moore. During this time the TLA was a movie theater showing an eclectic mix of movies including foreign films and cult classics. The entertainment group formed off of it and became a movie distribution store with a variety of obscure movies available for rent by catalog, online, and in their own retail stores. The original retail store opened next door to the theatre.

TLA film controversy 
In February 1986 the TLA found itself in the middle of a controversy when the theatre decided to show Jean-Luc Godard’s Hail Mary. The film was very controversial among Catholics at the time leading it to be denounced by Pope John Paul II in April 1985. In response to the announcement of the film's premiere, the TLA group received a hundred calls a day and 2,000 letters in protest. The film was eventually shown at the TLA for a week and was met with picketers and protesters causing South Street to be shut down for a time.

Pink Flamingos 

The TLA has been accredited in helping launch filmmaker and writer John Waters's career. In its movie theatre days, the TLA played his cult classic movies such as Pink Flamingos when no other mainstream movie theatre would. Due to the huge success of his films at the TLA, other theatres followed making the TLA an important aspect of Pink Flamingos' and John Waters' success.

See also
House Of Blues

References

Music venues in Philadelphia
Live Nation Entertainment